Missulena langlandsi is a species of mygalomorph spiders in the family Actinopodidae. It is found in Western Australia.

References

langlandsi
Spiders described in 2013